Issoudun-Létrieix is a commune in the Creuse department in the Nouvelle-Aquitaine region in central France.

Geography
The commune is in the valley of the Creuse.

Population

Sights
 The thirteenth-century church.
 An ancient oil mill.
 Vestiges of Roman occupation.
 The fifteenth-century château de Haute-Faye.

See also
Communes of the Creuse department

References

Communes of Creuse